

See also 

 List of Maharashtra Government Engineering Colleges
 List of Rajasthan Government Engineering Colleges
 List of Tamil Nadu Government Engineering Colleges

Lists of Indian state Government Engineering Colleges
 
Government Engineering Colleges
|}